Excoecaria benthamiana is a species of plant in the family Euphorbiaceae. It is endemic to Seychelles.

References

benthamiana
Vulnerable plants
Endemic flora of Seychelles
Taxonomy articles created by Polbot